A community of circumstance is similar to a community of practice, except that it is driven by position, circumstance or life experiences rather than a shared interest.  Examples might include cancer sufferers using a support newsgroup or the members of gay/lesbian newsgroups. A prison or other correctional facility can be thought of as a community of circumstance; passengers of the same plane form a temporary community of circumstance as well.

Related to 
 Community of action
 Community of inquiry
 Community of interest
 Community of place
 Community of position
 Community of practice
 Community of purpose

References

External links 
 DepressionNET: a web based community of circumstance for people living with depression

Circumstance